Quit Your Dayjob is a Swedish dance-punk band originating from Malmö/Scania, Sweden made up of Jonass (on guitar and vocals), Marcass (synthesizer) and Drumass (drums). They were signed to Bad Taste Records in Sweden. They have opened for OK GO and played gigs with        Ted Leo and the Pharmacists and as Ted Leo stated on Har Mar Superstar's Earwolf podcast that their song "Look A Dollar" is his favorite song.

Discography

Albums
2004: Quit Your Dayjob (EP)
2005: Sweden We Got A Problem
2007: Tools for Fools

Singles
2005: Vlado 
2007: Bodypoppers

External links

Swedish punk rock groups